Gibbs Mountain is a small peak located in Framingham, Massachusetts with an elevation of , named after a local homesteader, Micah Gibbs. The summit is located in Callahan State Park and is traversed by the Red Tail Trail and Bay Circuit Trail, as well as the 3.7 mile Gibbs Mountain Loop Trail. The summit is marked by a small pile of rocks in a small clearing.

References

Framingham, Massachusetts
Mountains of Massachusetts
Mountains of Middlesex County, Massachusetts
Bay Circuit Trail